Goryń  is a village in the administrative district of Gmina Jastrzębia, within Radom County, Masovian Voivodeship, in east-central Poland.

The village has a population of 1,318.

References

Villages in Radom County